The Harbor Bridge Project (or New Harbor Bridge or US 181 Harbor Bridge) is the replacement of the existing through arch bridge that crosses the Corpus Christi Ship Channel, which serves the Port of Corpus Christi in Corpus Christi, Texas, with a modern cable-stayed bridge design. The route will connect with SH 286 (the Crosstown Expressway) at its southern terminus and US 181 on the north. Groundbreaking on construction took place on August 8, 2016 and was scheduled to be completed by the spring of 2020, but was extensively delayed due to engineering and design issues, and is tentatively planned to be completed in 2025.

History 
Planning for the bridge began in 2003 to address the maintenance and safety issues of the existing Corpus Christi Harbor Bridge as well as provide long term access to the Port of Corpus Christi to larger ship vessels (including Panamax). Texas Department of Transportation (TxDOT) awarded developer Flatiron/Dragados with the design–build contract for the project. The old bridge will be demolished upon project completion.

Design 
The new design is a cable-stayed bridge made up of twin precast concrete delta frame segmental box girders that spans 1,661 feet across the entire ship channel bank-to-bank, providing 205 feet of clearance above the water. The twin parallel cable-stays are arranged in a fan along middle of the mixed-use deck 134 feet wide that carry six lanes of US 181 and a bicycle and pedestrian path with a mid-span belvedere facing the Gulf of Mexico. The approaches are of the same box girder type supported by columns 180 feet apart.

Construction 
To assemble the superstructure, box girders which are cast near the bridge site are lifted and brought into place using a self-propelled gantry crane, and then the tendons are post-tensioned before the crane moves to the next segment and repeats. 

The structure is slated to be the longest cable-stayed, concrete segmental bridge in the North America. If completed before the Gordie Howe International Bridge, also under construction, it will also briefly have the longest cable-stayed span in the North America. Using a similar construction method is the nearby John F. Kennedy Memorial Causeway, the first precast concrete post-tensioned segmental box girder bridge in the United States.

Construction suspension 
In March 2018, a pedestrian bridge collapse in Florida prompted extensive reevaluation of bridge construction across the United States. An NTSB investigation ultimately concluded that the chief probable cause for the Florida bridge collapse was an error in design by the FIGG Bridge Group. FIGG was also the engineer for the Harbor Bridge Project. This prompted a design review by TxDOT who in 2019 ultimately asked the bridge developer Flatiron/Dragados to remove FIGG and select a different engineering firm.

In July 2020 the developer designated the new engineer for the project as Arup-, who expected no major changes. Construction resumed in August 2021.

In July 2022 a TxDOT-ordered independent review by International Bridge Technologies found significant design flaws that persisted in its design, including five primary areas of concern. TxDOT subsequently suspended work on the bridge. The developer Flatiron/Dragados disputes some of these findings, and as of September 2022 discussion are ongoing with TxDOT regarding future construction and potential design remedies.

TxDOT and Arup-CFC resolved one of the five design issues, deciding to add additional steel reinforcement to the delta box girders, and work has resumed on those sections as of November 3, 2022. Construction of the approach spans has continued despite the halt on the main span and towers, and are over 80% complete as of October 28.

See also

Notes

References

External links
 
 Historical site

Proposed bridges in the United States
Bridges under construction
Bridges in Texas
Cable-stayed bridges in the United States